Empress Zhang (died July or August 237), personal name unknown, formally known as Empress Jing'ai (lit. "Respectful and Lamentable Empress"), was an empress of the state of Shu Han in the Three Kingdoms period. She was the eldest daughter of the Shu general Zhang Fei and his wife Lady Xiahou, niece of Wei's general Xiahou Yuan. She married Liu Shan in 221 and became the crown princess of Shu. In 223 when Liu Bei died, Liu Shan ascended the throne of Shu, and Zhang became the empress. She died in 237 and was buried in Nanling (南陵). She was succeeded by her younger sister.

In the novel Romance of the Three Kingdoms she doesn't marry Liu Shan until after he is Emperor with Zhuge Liang recommending her for her prudence.

See also
 Shu Han family trees
 Lists of people of the Three Kingdoms

Notes

References

 Chen, Shou (3rd century). Records of the Three Kingdoms (Sanguozhi).
 Pei, Songzhi (5th century). Annotations to Records of the Three Kingdoms (Sanguozhi zhu).
 Robert Joe Cutter and William Gordon Crowell. Empresses and Consorts: Selections from Chen Shou's Records of the Three States with Pei Songzhi's Commentary. Honolulu: University of Hawai'i Press, 1999.

237 deaths
Shu Han empresses
Year of birth unknown